The Pendleton Round-Up and Happy Canyon Hall of Fame, is a hall of fame located in Pendleton, Oregon, United States. Begun in 1969, it was the first hall of fame started by an individual show, the Pendleton Round-Up.  Exhibits focus on show memorabilia, and cowboy and Native American artifacts, including a full-sized teepee, saddles, clothing, Indian regalia, photographs, weapons, trophies, and wagons.

Hall of Fame Inductees

2020-2021 Inductees
Butch Knowles
Jack Shaw
Mary Hines
Badger (horse)

2019 Inductees
Trevor Brazile
Marlo & Billy Ward
Steve Corey
Dean Forth
Source:

2016 Inductees
J.D. Yates
 Doug and Heather Corey
Chief Bill Burke
Smokey (gelding)

2015 Inductees
Lewis Feild
Cecelia Bearchum

2014 Inductees
Robin A. Fletcher, Jr
Clint Corey
Fritz Hill
Gary Rempel

2013 Inductees
Mike Beers
Betty Branstetter
Echo "Magic" (mare)

2012 Inductees
Gilbert Minthorn
Poker Jim
Amos Pond
No Shirt
Caroline Motanic Davis
Frank McCarroll
George Richmond

2011 Inductees
Kenny Stanton
Flint Rasmussen
John Spain
Wes Grilley

2010 Inductees
King Merritt
Roy "Super Looper" Cooper
Tom Currin
V.W. "Mac" McCormack

2009 Inductees
Ollie Osborn
Willie Wocatsie
Deb Copenhaver

2008 Inductees
Christian “Sonny” Frederick Davis
Fred W. Hill
Bonnie Tucker Blankinship

2007 Inductees
C.M. “Mort” Bishop, Jr.
Phillip Morris Lyne
John S. “Jiggs” Fisk

2006 Inductees
Louie & Marie Dick
Harry Charters
Slim Pickens
Jack Q. Hodgen

2005 Inductees
Cataldo*
Walk Arnold
William G. “Wilbur” Shaw
Ron J. Hudson

2004 Inductees
Casey Tibbs
Dr. Richard Koch
Jesse Jones, Jr.
 
2003 Inductees
Wallace Smith
Chief Raymond Burke
Pat Gugin

2002 Inductees
Guy Allen
Frank Tubbs

2001 Inductees
Ester Motanic
R.W. Fletcher
Bonnie McCarroll
Jack Sweek

2000 Inductees
Beauregard*
Paul Cimmiyotti
Susie Williams
McKinley Williams
Bill McMacken

1999 Inductees
Main Street Cowboys
Jim Shoulders
Beryl Grilley

1998 Inductees
Harry Vold
Larry Mahan
Bob & Betty Byer

1997 Inductees
Elgin Stagecoach Team
Dick Truitt
Jim Rosenberg
Lawrence G. Frazier

1996 Inductees
The Currin Family
Tom Simonton
Dean Oliver

1995 Inductees
Everett Shaw
Bertha Kapernik Blancett
The Hawkins Brothers

1994 Inductees
John Dalton
Herman Rosenberg

1993 Inductees
Leonard King
Floyd “Bus” Howdyshell

1992 Inductees
William Minthorn
Lester H. Hamley
J.J. Hamley
J. David Hamley
Don McLaughlin
Duff Severe
Bill Severe

1991 Inductees
Tessie Williams
Gerald Swaggart

1990 Inductees
Monty*
Verne Terjeson
Doris Swayze Bounds

1989 Inductees
Jack Duff
Bob Chambers

1988 Inductees
Shorty*
Bob Christensen
Mildred Searcy

1987 Inductees
Ella Lazinka Ganger
Bob Hales

1986 Inductees
Molly*
Sid Seale
Pat Folsom

1985 Inductees
Peanuts*
Everett Bowman
Bob Fletcher

1984 Inductees
Clark McIntire
Art Motanic

1983 Inductees
Karl Doering
George Doak
Dan Bell

1982 Inductees
Roy Bishop
Clarence Bishop
Chauncey Bishop

1981 Inductees
Ike Rude
Harley Tucker

1980 Inductees
Necklace*
Monte Montana

1979 Inductees
Finis Kirkpatrick

1978 Inductees
Sharkey*
Monk Carden
George Moens

1977 Inductees
Domino*
Marion Hansell
Lew W. Minor
Eliza Bill

1976 Inductees
Dr. Joseph Brennan
Berkley Davis

1975 Inductees
Miss Klamath*
Shoat Webster
Elsie Fitzmaurice Dickson

1974 Inductees
Blue Blazes*
Bob Crosby
Bill Switzler

1973 Inductees
Bill McAdoo*
Tim Bernard
Melissa Parr
John Hales

1972 Inductees
Sam Jackson*
Jackson Sundown
E.N. “Pink” Boylen

1971 Inductees
U-Tell-Um*
Badger Mountain*
Phillip Bill
Pete Knight
Mabel Strickland
Lawrence Lieuallen
Hugo Strickland
Allen Drumheller

1970 Inductees
5 Minutes to Midnight*
Roosevelt Trophy
Raye LeGrow
Carl Arnold

1969 Inductees
Phillip Rollins*
No Name*
Long Tom*
Midnight*
War Paint*
Yakima Canutt
Til Taylor
Roy Raley
Lee Caldwell
Herb Thompson
Henry Collins
George Strand
George Fletcher
Gene Rambo
Clarence Burke

Source:

    * An animal inductee

References

External links
 The Pendleton Round-Up and Happy Canyon Hall of Fame introduction page
 Official Website

 

Cowboy halls of fame
Halls of fame in Oregon
American West museums in Oregon
Native American museums in Oregon
Museums in Umatilla County, Oregon
Buildings and structures in Pendleton, Oregon
Organizations established in 1969
1969 establishments in Oregon